Paradocus griseovittatus is a species of beetle in the family Cerambycidae. It was described by Stephan von Breuning in 1940.

References

Theocridini
Beetles described in 1940